Kovvali may refer to:
Kovvali Lakshmi Narasimha Rao, a Telugu writer
Kovvali, West Godavari district, a village in Denduluru mandal